Lâm Thị Mỹ Dạ (born Lệ Thủy, Quảng Bình, 18 September 1949) is a Vietnamese poet.

Works
Collection: Green Rice (English translation)

References

20th-century Vietnamese poets
1949 births
Living people
Vietnamese women poets
20th-century women writers
21st-century Vietnamese women